Per Eriksson may refer to:

 Per Eriksson (professor) (born 1949), Swedish signal processing scientist 
 Per Thomas Eriksson (born 1963), Swedish Olympic athlete, son of Per Eriksson (decathlete)
 Per Eriksson (musician) (born 1982), Swedish heavy metal guitarist
 Per Axel Eriksson (1925–2016), Swedish decathlete

See also
 Pär Ericsson (born 1988), Swedish footballer